Kobi or KOBI may refer to:

 Kobi (given name), including a list of people with the name
 Kobi, a colour, a variation of red-violet
 Kobi, Georgia, a village
 Kobi Line, a railway in North Korea
 Kobi Station, a railway station in Minokamo, Gifu, Japan
 KOBI (TV), a TV station in Medford, Oregon, U.S.
 Woodbine Municipal Airport (New Jersey), U.S., ICAO airport code KOBI

See also 

 Cobi (disambiguation)
 Kobe (disambiguation)